The Indianapolis Metropolitan Police Department (IMPD) is the law enforcement agency for the city of Indianapolis, Indiana, in the United States. Its operational jurisdiction covers all of the consolidated city of Indianapolis and Marion County except for the Airport Authority and the four excluded cities of Beech Grove, Lawrence, Southport and Speedway (see Unigov). It was created on January 1, 2007, by consolidating the Indianapolis Police Department and the road division of the Marion County Sheriff's Office. Indianapolis Park Rangers were merged into IMPD in 2009.

Organization 

At the time of its formation, the IMPD was headed by the elected sheriff of Marion County, Frank J. Anderson. However, on February 29, 2008, the department came under the control of the mayor of Indianapolis, Greg Ballard, after Ballard and Anderson reached a resolution for the transfer of power and the City-County Council passed Proposal 6 effecting the change. The mayor appoints the Chief of Police to administer the daily operations of the department. IMPD has six service districts.

Rank structure
The rank structure of the department is as follows:

Weapons
Glock 22 .40 S&W was standard issue and was to be phased out in 2016, but following issues with the Glock 17M, the Glock 22 was put back into service until the issue could be addressed with Glock and the department.
Glock 17M 9mm is the new issue weapon for 2016 and 2017. Currently all sworn officers have been issued the 17M and the Glock 22 has been completely phased out.
Remington 870 Pump Action is the standard issue shotgun for the department. The department also uses a less lethal shotgun for certain situations where deadly force isn't needed but a Taser or pepper spray is ineffective.
AR-15 is the patrol rifle utilized by the officers of the department during intense situations and other situations where a pistol or a shotgun is to little effect. The IMPD uses the Colt CAR-15A3 RO997 (M4A1) as does the agency's SWAT unit.

On-duty deaths 
, four Indianapolis Metropolitan police officers have been killed in the line of duty.

See also

 List of law enforcement agencies in Indiana

References

External links

 Indianapolis Metropolitan Police Department site
 Service Districts
2020 IMPD Annual Report

Police
County police departments of Indiana
Municipal police departments of Indiana
2007 establishments in Indiana